The England national cricket team toured the West Indies from January to April 1930 and played a four-match Test series against the West Indies cricket team which was drawn 1–1. England were captained by Freddie Calthorpe; West Indies by a different captain at each venue. They were the first Tests played in the West Indies.

At the same time another English team, captained by Harold Gilligan, was touring New Zealand, playing New Zealand's first Test series. It was the only time one country has played in two Test matches on the same day.

English team

 Freddie Calthorpe (captain) 
 Les Ames
 Ewart Astill
 George Gunn
 Nigel Haig
 Patsy Hendren
 Jack O'Connor
 Fred Price
 Wilfred Rhodes
 Andy Sandham 
 Rony Stanyforth 
 Greville Stevens
 Leslie Townsend 
 Bill Voce
 Bob Wyatt 

The team was, by a wide margin, the oldest Test tour party of all time, with an average age of nearly 38 years. The manager was the veteran administrator Harry Mallett.

Test match summary

First Test

Second Test

Third Test

Fourth Test

References

External links
 England in West Indies, 1929-30 at Cricinfo
 England to West Indies 1929-30 at Test Cricket Tours
 Marylebone Cricket Club in West Indies 1929-30 at CricketArchive

1930 in English cricket
1930 in West Indian cricket
1929-30
International cricket competitions from 1918–19 to 1945
West Indian cricket seasons from 1918–19 to 1944–45